Sudi may refer to:

People
 Abdullahi Sudi Arale
 Ahmed Sudi, 16th-century Bosnian commentator under the Ottoman Empire
 Haji Sudi, leader of the Somali Dervish movement
 Musa Sudi Yalahow, Somali politician
 Oscar Sudi, Kenyan politician
 Sudi Devanesen
 Sudi Silalahi (1949–2021), Indonesian politician
 Sudi Özkan, Turkish businessman

Places
 Sudi, India, panchayat town in the Gadag District of Karnataka, India
 Sudi or Mulukbu, Kenya